Dr Mike Bullivant is a British organic photochemist and TV presenter, perhaps best known for his appearances in all six series (34 episodes in all) of BBC's Rough Science. 

Bullivant also presented all 6 episodes of the BBC/Open University series The Chemistry of Almost Everything which, in 1996, was the first Open University series to be shown in a prime-time slot, rather than the usual overnight slots traditionally reserved for OU broadcasts.

Bullivant has also appeared as a Chemistry contributor in a number of other BBC television series, including Victorian Pharmacy and Coast.

Bullivant studied Chemistry at the University of Wales (Cardiff) and obtained a PhD in organic photochemistry at the Universities of Cardiff and Nottingham. The title of his thesis was ‘The Photochemistry of the Pyrethrin Insecticides’.

in 2007, Bullivant was awarded an honorary MUniv degree by the Open University, for his ‘significant contribution to the education and culture of Milton Keynes’. For more than 25 years, Bullivant organised events on the campus at the OU’s headquarters in Milton Keynes, as well as at other local venues. These included performances by small-scale touring theatre companies, comedy evenings (Café Olé and Binliner Ensemble, amongst others), educational talks, charity-fundraisers, and music gigs covering a wide range of global musical styles.

In 1978, Bullivant was a founding member (along with Pauline Bachelor and Dick Skellington) of the Open Theatre Group, the amateur drama group based on the Open University campus in Milton Keynes. He directed, appeared in or otherwise helped with many of their stage productions. 

Bullivant, along with Mike Boyd, formed the Flying Banana Brothers, a crazy comedy duo that performed locally, and twice in the Circus Field at the Glastonbury Festival (in 1984 and 1985). 

Bullivant took early retirement from the Open University in December 2004.

References

External links

 Mike Bullivant's OpenLearn scientist profile

Living people
British chemists
Year of birth missing (living people)